Ignitis Group (Ignitis grupė AB; former name: Lietuvos Energija UAB) is a state-controlled energy holding company located in Vilnius, Lithuania. Its subsidiaries are involved in power and heat generation and distribution, natural gas trade and distribution, and supporting services.

Ignitis Group shares are predominantly owned by the Ministry of Finance of the Republic of Lithuania, with the current Chairman of the Board and CEO of the company being Darius Maikštėnas.

The initial public offering was made on 7 October 2020.
Ignitis Group shares are listed in Nasdaq Vilnius and London Stock Exchange.

History
Lietuvos Energija was founded in 1991. It was a vertically integrated state-owned enterprise that owned and operated all electrical and heating businesses in Lithuania apart from the Ignalina Nuclear Power Plant. In 1997, the company was registered as Lietuvos Energija AB and it was partly privatized. The government kept 86.5% of the shares while 8.5% was privatized to the company's workers, and 5% to the Swedish company Vattenfall. In 2002, power generation companies AB Lietuvos Elektrinė and AB Mažeikių Elektrinė, and distribution grid companies AB Rytų skirstomieji tinklai and AB Vakarų skirstomieji tinklai were separated from Lietuvos Energija. In 2007, Lietuvos Energija acquired a stake in UAB Geoterma, the owner and operator of the Klaipėda Geothermal Demonstration Plant.

In 2008, Lietuvos Energija was transferred to newly established energy holding company LEO LT. After dissolution of LEO LT in 2010, Lietuvos Energija became a subsidiary of UAB Visagino Atomine Elektrine, a state-owned project company of the Visaginas Nuclear Power Plant.  At the same year, the company acquired Lietuvos Elektrinė, another subsidiary of Visagino Atomine Elektrine. In September 2012, the transmission system operator Litgrid and the electricity market operator Baltpool were separated from Lietuvos Energija and spun off to the state-owned company EPSO-G.

In 2013, Lietuvos Energija AB changed its name to Lietuos Energijos Gamyba AB, and its parent company UAB Visagino Atominė Elektrinė has changed its name to Lietuvos Energija UAB.

In October 2017, Lietuvos Energija acquired the Vilnius Combined Heat and Power Plant (Vilnius Power Plant-3) from Vilniaus šilumos tinklai. In 2018, Lietuvos Energija bought Lithuanian wind park operators UAB Vejo Vatas and UAB Vejo Gusis with a 34-MW wind portfolio. It also acquired a 50-MW wind park project in Poland.

On 5 September 2019, Lietuvos Energija was renamed Ignitis Group. Lietuvos Energijos Tiekimas, Energijos Tiekimas, Gilė and Litgas were merged to form Ignitis UAB. Lietuvos Energijos Gamyba became Ignitis Gamyba and Lietuvos Energija Renewables became Ignitis Renewables. Other subsidiaries, except Energijos Skirstymo Operatorius, were also renamed accordingly.

In 2020, "Ignitis grupė" implemented the initial public distribution of shares (English IPO), after which its shares were listed on the "Nasdaq Vilnius" stock exchange. After the IPO, 450 million was raised in the company. EUR capital, and the state continues to control the controlling share package – 74.99 percent. shares.

On September 9, 2021, Ignitis grupė acquired 100% of the capital of Ignitis gamyba.

Operations

Lietuvos Energijos Gamyba (96.82% stake owned by Ignitis Group) owns the Elektrėnai Power Plant, the Kruonis Pumped Storage Plant, the Kaunas Hydroelectric Power Plant, and the Vilnius Combined Heat and Power Plant. Ignitis supplies electricity through Energijos Skirstymo Operatorius AB (94.79% stake owned by Ignitis Group) and natural gas through Ignitis UAB. Its subsidiary UAB Ignitis Renewables is responsible for the wind energy and renewable energy development projects. In addition to Lithuania, Ignitis operates in Estonia, Latvia, Poland, and Finland.

References

External links
 

Electric power companies of Lithuania
Natural gas companies of Lithuania
Companies based in Vilnius
Energy companies established in 1991
Non-renewable resource companies established in 1991
1991 establishments in Lithuania